Guido Kratschmer (born 10 January 1953 in Klotzenhof, West Germany) is a retired West German decathlete. His sports club was the USC Mainz.

Kratschmer competed at the 1976 Summer Olympics in Montreal, where he won the silver medal in the men's decathlon event. He could not participate at the 1980 Summer Olympics because of the boycott.

In 1980, Kratschmer broke the world record held by Daley Thompson, but in 1982, Kratschmer's mark was in turn topped by Thompson.

Kratschmer's personal best total in the decathlon was 8667 points, achieved in June 1980 in Bernhausen, West Germany. This total ranks him sixth all-time among German decathletes, behind Jürgen Hingsen, Uwe Freimuth, Siegfried Wentz, Frank Busemann and Torsten Voss.

International competitions

References

External links
 
 
 

People from Miltenberg (district)
Sportspeople from Lower Franconia
1953 births
Living people
West German decathletes
Olympic athletes of West Germany
West German male athletes
Olympic silver medalists for West Germany
Athletes (track and field) at the 1976 Summer Olympics
Athletes (track and field) at the 1984 Summer Olympics
Medalists at the 1976 Summer Olympics
World Athletics Championships athletes for West Germany
European Athletics Championships medalists
World record setters in athletics (track and field)
Olympic silver medalists in athletics (track and field)